The Ron Massey Cup (formerly known as the Bundaberg Red Cup and Jim Beam Cup) is a semi-professional development level rugby league competition in New South Wales (NSW), Australia, run jointly by the New South Wales Rugby League (NSWRL) and the Country Rugby League of New South Wales (CRL). The competition is run concurrently with the National Rugby League (NRL). It currently comprises 13 teams drawn from the Sydney metropolitan area. The competition is named after Ron Massey, a former rugby league coach. Ron Massey died 19 September 2016.

The competition is an expanded version of the former Metropolitan Cup and Second Division competitions. The competition was renamed the Bundaberg Red Cup after the 2008 season (the last Jim Beam Cup season), after Bundaberg replaced former sponsor Jim Beam. For the 2013 season, the competition was re-branded as the Ron Massey Cup, when Bundaberg Rum withdrew their sponsorship.

Clubs

*: The season the team joined is in the Jim Beam Cup/Bundaberg Red Cup/Ron Massey Cup, not any other competition before this.
a - Glebe previously competed as the Glebe-Burwood-Concord Wolves until 2021.
b - Ryde Eastwood did not compete from 2005 to 2020.
c - St Marys previously competed as a merged entity in 2003. 
d - Western Suburbs did not compete in 2020.

Former Teams in the Ron Massey Cup

 St Mary's-Penrith Cougars (2003)
 South Sydney Juniors (2003-2004)
 Woy Woy Roosters (2003-2004)
 Ourimbah Magpies (2003-2005)1
 Newtown Jets (2003-2006)
 Seven Hills Demons (2007)
 Belrose Eagles (2005-2008)
 Erina Eagles (2003–2008)
 Shellharbour City Marlins (2007-2008)
 Southern Sydney Sharks (2008)
 WA Reds (2008-2009)
 Chester Hill Rhinos (2007-2009)
 Southern Districts Rebels (2009)
 Campbelltown Eagles (2008-2010)

 Bankstown Sports (2011)
 Sydney Bulls (2003-2011)2(Named Bankstown City Bulls from 2009 to 2010)
 St Johns Eagles (2011-2012)3 
 Burwood North-Ryde United (2012-2014)
 The Entrance Tigers (2003-2007, 2010-2014)
 Kingsgrove Colts (2011-2016)
 Auburn Warriors (2012-2017)
 Penrith Brothers (2009-2010, 2018-2019)
 Asquith Magpies (2005-2007. 2013-2016, 2018-2020)
 Guildford Owls (2003, 2013-2020)
 Windsor Wolves (2003-2016, 2020-2021)
 Cabramatta Two Blues (2004-2021)
 Western Suburbs Magpies (2013-2019, 2021-2022)

1 - Ourimbah withdrew from the competition midway through the 2005 season.
2 - Sydney Bulls withdrew from the competition midway through the 2011 season.
3 - St Johns Eagles joined the competition midway through the 2011 season, replacing the Sydney Bulls.

History

The Ron Massey Cup is the latest in a succession of Sydney-based second tier, semi-professional Rugby League competitions.

Inter-District/Second Division (1963 - 1973)

The second tier senior Rugby League competition in Sydney was the Inter-District Competition established in 1963 by the NSWRL. It was renamed the Second Division in 1964. Like succeeding competitions the Second Division had a high turnover of participating clubs. The 'promotion' of two of the two biggest clubs Penrith Panthers (1966 champions) and Cronulla-Sutherland Sharks, at the conclusion of the 1966 season did not help the long-term stability of the competition.

During this period Wentworthville ("The Magpies") was the most successful club, competing in every grand final of the Second Division, winning a total of 8 premierships (including 5 in a row between 1967 and 1971). Due to their domination of the competition 'Wenty' was widely considered the best candidate for promotion to the NSWRL Premiership when two positions were made available for the 1967 competition. Due to their proximity to Parramatta, where a Premiership club was established in 1947, the Magpies were overlooked.

The Metropolitan League (1974 - 1976)
The Second Division was reorganised in 1974 and renamed the Metropolitan League. It was dominated by the Ryde-Eastwood club. In the absence of Wentworthville, who competed in the Illawarra Rugby League competition, Ryde-Eastwood won all three Metropolitan League titles. The Metropolitan League was dismantled in 1976 and with it the idea of a second-tier competition.

The Metropolitan Cup (1990 - 2002)

The concept of the second-tier competition was resurrected in 1990 with the establishment of the Metropolitan Cup. Many teams that were involved in the former Second Division and Metropolitan League were included in the new competition, including Ryde-Eastwood and Wentworthville. Other teams in the new competition included the Guildford Owls, Mount Pritchard, Bankstown Greyhounds, Western Suburbs Magpies and the Hills District Bulls. The Newtown Jets, who had been exiled from the New South Wales Rugby League premiership at the close of the 1983 season, were also granted admission into the competition in 1991 and became a successful club in their second life, winning 4 premierships (including 3 in a row between 1995 and 1997).Other teams who competed in the cup over the years included St. Marys Saints, West Wollongong Red Devils, Moorebank Rams (Bulldogs), UTS Roosters, Windsor Wolves, Cabramatta Blues, Sydney Bulls and the Kellyville Bushrangers

The final Metropolitan Cup was contested in 2002 and was won by a newly formed club, the Sydney Bulls, defeating Ryde-Eastwood in the last grand final of the Metropolitan Cup.

Jim Beam Cup (2003-2008)

The Jim Beam Cup was established in 2003 as part of another overall restructure of the NSWRL competitions operating in the levels below the NRL. The Jim Beam Cup was intended to lay the foundations of a semi-professional 'State League' competition (similar to the Queensland Cup) and included four non-Sydney teams from the Central Coast (Erina Eagles, The Entrance Tigers, Ourimbah Magpies, and Woy Woy Roosters.) With the inclusion of these clubs (who field teams in the Central Coast Division of the CRL) the Jim Beam Cup became a cooperative effort between the NSWRL and the CRL.

Radio coverage was heard on Hawkesbury Radio 89.9FM with Peter Jolly and Shane Skeen.

Bundaberg Red Cup (2009 - 2012)
The 2009 Grand Final was a closely fought battle between Minor Premiers Wentworthville Magpies and Cabramatta Two Blues, with Wentworthville coming out victorious by 24–20 in the game at Leichhardt Oval.

Ron Massey Cup (2013 - )
During the 2012/13 offseason it was announced that Bundaberg Rum had withdrawn their sponsorship, and the competition would be renamed as the Ron Massey Cup, after the great Parramatta assistant coach.

Premiership Tally 

Bold means the team is still currently playing in the competition.

Timeline of Teams
The following timeline displays the participation of clubs in the Ron Massey Cup and its most recent predecessors, The Metropolitan Cup, the Jim Beam and Bundaberg Red Cups. The competitions had Top 4 final series from 1990 to 2002, Top 5 from 2003 to 2012, and Top 8 from 2013 to 2019. Three teams from the cancelled 2020 Ron Massey Cup participated in the 2020 President's Cup, two making the four team final series.

Since its establishment in 2003 the competition has both expanded and contracted in terms of numbers of sides competing. Aside from the original expansion of the Sydney-based competition into the Central Coast, the Bundaberg Red Cup has continued to expand throughout Sydney, moving away from its Western Sydney base in 2005 with the inclusion of two Northern Sydney sides: the Asquith Magpies and Belrose Eagles.

2000s
2003 
2003 saw the inauguration of the new Jim Beam Cup. It featured eight teams from Sydney and four from the Central Coast.

 Erina Eagles
 Guildford Owls
 Newtown Jets
 Ourimbah Magpies
 Ryde-Eastwood Hawks
 St Mary's-Penrith Cougars
 South Sydney Juniors
 Sydney Bulls
 The Entrance Tigers
 Wentworthville Magpies
 Windsor Wolves
 Woy Woy Roosters

2004 
The St Mary's-Penrith Cougars left to focus on their NSW Premier League side, and were replaced by the Cabramatta Two-Blues.

 Cabramatta Two-Blues
 Erina Eagles
 Guildford Owls
 Newtown Jets
 Ourimbah Magpies
 Ryde-Eastwood Hawks
 South Sydney Juniors
 Sydney Bulls
 The Entrance Tigers
 Wentworthville Magpies
 Windsor Wolves
 Woy Woy Roosters

2005 
 Asquith Magpies
 Belrose Eagles
 Cabramatta Two-Blues
 Erina Eagles
 Newtown Jets
 Ourimbah Magpies (failed to complete the season)
 Sydney Bulls
 The Entrance Tigers
 Wentworthville Magpies
 Windsor Wolves
 Woy Woy Roosters

2006 
The Woy Woy Roosters withdrew.
 Asquith Magpies
 Belrose Eagles
 Cabramatta Two-Blues
 Erina Eagles
 Newtown Jets
 Sydney Bulls
 The Entrance Tigers
 Wentworthville Magpies
 Windsor Wolves

2007 
In 2007, 12 clubs competed for the Jim Beam Cup. New clubs Shellharbour, Chester Hill, Seven Hills and Mount Pritchard competed for the first time. The Newtown Jets dropped out of the competition to concentrate on their club's 2007 NSWRL Premier League campaign.

 Asquith Magpies
 Belrose Eagles
 Cabramatta Two-Blues
 Chester Hill Rhinos
 Erina Eagles
 Mount Pritchard Mounties
 Seven Hills Demons
 Shellharbour City Marlins
 Sydney Bulls
 The Entrance Tigers
 Wentworthville Magpies
 Windsor Wolves

In terms of geographical spread four clubs were based in the Parramatta District (Wentworthville, Seven Hills, Cabramatta and Mount Pritchard), two on the Central Coast of NSW (Erina and The Entrance) and Canterbury-Bankstown (Chester Hill and Sydney Bulls) and one each in Penrith (Windsor Wolves), Manly-Warringah (Belrose), Illawarra (Shellharbour) and North Sydney (Asquith).

2008 
In 2008, for the first time, an interstate team entered the competition, a Western Australia Rugby League representative side known as the WA Reds, with a view to developing the game in the state in order to secure a future NRL franchise in 2011 - 2012. The Cronulla Sutherland Sharks and the Campbelltown Eagles also joined the competition. The Seven Hills Demons announced that they would not field a team in the Jim Beam Cup in Season 2008. The Entrance Tigers, who had claimed the 2007 title, unfortunately pulled out of the Jim Beam Cup due to the restrictions placed on gambling and smoking in clubs and pubs. The Asquith Magpies also withdrew from the competition.
 Belrose Eagles
 Cabramatta Two-Blues
 Campbelltown Eagles
 Chester Hill Rhinos
 Erina Eagles
 Mount Pritchard Mounties
 Shellharbour City Marlins
 Southern Sharks
 Sydney Bulls
 WA Reds
 Wentworthville Magpies
 Windsor Wolves

2009 
 Bankstown City Bulls
 Cabramatta Two-Blues
 Campbelltown Eagles
 Chester Hill Rhinos
 Mount Pritchard Mounties
 Penrith Brothers
 Southern Districts Rebels
 WA Reds
 Wentworthville Magpies
 Windsor Wolves

2010s
2010 
 Bankstown City Bulls
 Cabramatta Two-Blues
 Campbelltown Eagles
 Mount Pritchard Mounties
 Penrith Brothers
 The Entrance Tigers
 Wentworthville Magpies
 Windsor Wolves

2011 
In 2011, the Kingsgrove Colts joined the competition, based in the St George catchment area. As of Round 6, the Sydney Bulls left the competition due to financial difficulties.
 Bankstown Sports
 Cabramatta Two Blues
 Kingsgrove Colts
 Mount Prichard Mounties
 Sydney Bulls (failed to complete the season)
 The Entrance Tigers
 Wentworthville Magpies
 Windsor Wolves

2012 
 Auburn Warriors
 Blacktown Workers
 Burwood North Ryde
 Cabramatta Two Blues
 Kingsgrove Colts
 Mount Prichard Mounties
 The Entrance Tigers
 Wentworthville Magpies
 Windsor Wolves

2013 
 Asquith Magpies
 Auburn Warriors
 Blacktown Workers
 Burwood North Ryde
 Cabramatta Two Blues
 Kingsgrove Colts
 Mount Prichard Mounties
 The Entrance Tigers
 Wentworthville Magpies
 Western Suburbs Magpies
 Windsor Wolves

The Asquith Magpies returned, replacing the St Johns Eagles. The Guildford Owls made their return, and the Western Suburbs Magpies made their return following the merger of the NSW Cup entities.

2014 
 Asquith Magpies
 Auburn Warriors
 Blacktown Workers
 Burwood North Ryde
 Cabramatta Two Blues
 Guildford Owls
 Kingsgrove Colts
 Mount Prichard Mounties
 The Entrance Tigers
 Wentworthville Magpies
 Western Suburbs Magpies
 Windsor Wolves

2015 
 Asquith Magpies
 Auburn Warriors
 Blacktown Workers
 Burwood North Ryde
 Cabramatta Two Blues
 Guildford Owls
 Kingsgrove Colts
 Mount Prichard Mounties
 Wentworthville Magpies
 Western Suburbs Magpies
 Windsor Wolves

The reigning premiers, The Entrance Tigers withdrew. Western Suburbs, Cabramatta and Kingsgrove missed the eight-team finals series.

2016 
 Asquith Magpies
 Auburn Warriors
 Blacktown Workers
 Cabramatta Two Blues
 Concord-Burwood United Wolves
 Guildford Owls
 Hills District Bulls
 Kingsgrove Colts
 Mount Prichard Mounties
 St Mary's Saints
 Wentworthville Magpies
 Western Suburbs Magpies
 Windsor Wolves

The Hills District Bulls and St Mary's Saints joined the competition.

2017 
 Auburn Warriors
 Blacktown Workers Sea Eagles
 Cabramatta Two Blues
 Concord-Burwood-Glebe Wolves
 Guildford Owls
 Hills District Bulls
 Mounties
 St Mary's Saints
 Wentworthville
 Western Suburbs

2018 
 Asquith Magpies
 Blacktown Workers Sea Eagles
 Brothers Penrith
 Cabramatta Two Blues
 Glebe Dirty Reds
 Guildford Owls
 Hills District Bulls
 Mounties
 St Mary's
 Wentworthville
 Western Suburbs

Auburn did not field a team in the competition after being liquidated.

2019 
 Asquith Magpies
 Blacktown Workers Sea Eagles
 Brothers Penrith
 Cabramatta Two Blues
 Glebe Dirty Reds
 Guildford Owls
 Hills District Bulls
 Mount Pritchard Mounties
 St Mary's Saints
 Wentworthville Magpies
 Western Suburbs Magpies

2020s

2020 
For 2020 the 11 clubs in the list immediately below were included in the competition. After the first round on 14 & 15 March, the Ron Massey Cup was suspended and subsequently cancelled due to the COVID-19 pandemic in Australia. In that single, first round the winning teams were the Kaiviti Silktails (40-16 on their debut), Concord-Burwood-Glebe Wolves (12-4), Wentworthville (18-14), St Marys (44-32) and Blacktown Workers (30-4). Guildford had the bye.

The NSWRL subsequently arranged two men's competitions, a President's Cup and a reconfigured Sydney Shield. Hills District Bulls and Wentworthville entered teams in both competitions. Glebe-Burwood Wolves fielded a team in the President's Cup.

The President's Cup comprised four teams from within the Sydney metropolitan area and five teams from other areas of the state. The Sydney teams were Glebe-Burwood Wolves (finished as Runners-Up), North Sydney Bears (Semi-Finalist), Hills District Bulls (Semi-Finalist) and Wentworthville Magpies (8th). The teams from regions were Maitland Pickers (Premiers) from the Hunter Valley; Thirroul Butchers (5th) and Western Suburbs Red Devils (6th) from the Illawarra, Dubbo CYMS (7th) and a Western Rams representative team (9th). The Western Rams played their home games in Forbes, Orange, Mudgee and Bathurst.

On 28 September 2020, the NSWRL announced their intention to expand, from the 2021 season, the Ron Massey Cup to become a statewide competition. The statement also affirmed that Kaiviti Silktails from Fiji would be part of that competition.

 Asquith Magpies
 Blacktown Workers Sea Eagles
 Cabramatta Two Blues
 Glebe-Concord Wolves
 Guildford Owls
 Hills District Bulls
 Kaiviti Silktails
 Mount Pritchard Mounties
 St Mary's Saints
 Wentworthville Magpies
 Windsor Wolves

Due to the COVID-19 pandemic, the 2020 Ron Massey Cup was cancelled after one round of matches.

2021 
 Blacktown Workers Sea Eagles
 Cabramatta Two Blues
 Glebe Dirty Reds
 Hills District Bulls
 Kaiviti Silktails
 Mounties
 Ryde-Eastwood Hawks
 St Mary's
 Wentworthville
 Western Suburbs
 Windsor Wolves

2022 
 Blacktown Workers Sea Eagles
 Glebe Dirty Reds
 Hills Bulls
 Kaiviti Silktails
 Mounties
 Ryde-Eastwood Hawks
 St Mary's
 Wentworthville
 Western Suburbs

See also

 Canterbury Cup NSW
 Sydney Shield
 Presidents Cup
 NSW Challenge Cup
 Rugby League Competitions in Australia

Sources
 Big League
 Daily Telegraph (Australia)
 E.E. Christensen's Official Rugby League Yearbook 
 History of the Hawks 1963 - 2004 : a history of Ryde-Eastwood Leagues Club and Ryde-Eastwood District Rugby League Football Club Inc. (2004), Chris Karas 
 Never a backward step: the story of St Mary's Rugby League Club (2008), Alan Whiticker. 
 NSWRL Annual Reports
 Rugby League News (available on Trove)
 Rugby League Week
 St George & Sutherland Leader
 Sydney Morning Herald
All of the above are available at the State Library of NSW, although some collections are incomplete.
 NSWRL News, 2016 Grand Final edition.

References

 
Rugby league in Sydney
Rugby league competitions in New South Wales
1963 establishments in Australia
Sports leagues established in 1963
Professional sports leagues in Australia
Multi-national professional sports leagues